Chenchu Lakshmi is a 1943 Indian Telugu-language mythological film produced and directed by S. Saundara Rajan. The film was written by Samudrala Sr. and starred Kamala Kotnis, C. H. Narayana Rao, and Nagayya. Kamala Kotnis' beauty, dance and acting are the main attractions of this film.

Plot 
The Sikhanayaka of the Ahobila tribe prayed to Vishnu to give him his daughter. Vishnu, who had given her so, said that he would marry her himself. Thus the child born to the hill tribe leader was "Chenchu Lakshmi". Growing up as an adventurer. Vishnu murti came to earth in the form of Narahari and fell in love with that Lakshmi. The leader, who did not know Narahari's true form, put him to many tests and then married his daughter Narahari.

Cast 

 Kamala Kotnis as Chenchu Laksmi
 Nagayya as Chenchu Lakshmi's father
 C. H. Narayana Rao as Vishnu/Varaha
 Rushyendramani as Adilakshmi
 Satyam Lanka
 Garudachaari

Music 
The 12 songs and poems in the film were composed jointly by S. Rajeswara Rao, C. R. Subbaraman and R. N. Chinnayya written by Samudrala Sr.

 "Athi Bhagyasaali Nari Paricharana Kamala Pujari" -  Rushyendramani
 "Aadadi Adade, Aadanerchi Vetada Nerchina" -  Rushyendramanii
 "Intakanna Naakedi Bhagyamu" - V. Nagayya
 "Yeri Yeri Na Samaanulika Yeri" - R. Balasaraswathi Devi
 "Yelukovayya Obulesha Mammelukovayya" - R. Balasaraswathi Devi
 "Kanipanchitiva Naarasimha, Kanikarinchinava Ee Leela" - Kamala Kotnis
 "Kamalaanaatha" - Jagannatha Kamala Bhavarchita Padakamala
 "Kamalaanaatha" - Jagannatha Kamalaa Mohana
 "Dhanyudara Ne Narasimha Na Janma Tarinchenura Deva" - Nagayya
 "Nijamaadu Dana Needana, Ninu Nammi Manedana" -  Rushyendramani
 "Neede Baaramu Gadaa Deva Todu Needa Neeve Gadaa" - Nagayya
 "Pove Kadali Palugaki, Popove" - Rushyendramanii, R. Balasaraswathi Devi
 "Madhuramuga Ahaa Madhuramuga" - Balasaraswati, S. Venkatraman

Reception 
Famous author Gudipati Venkatachalam said in his Musings (page 280, 5th edition 2005):I listened to audio of the film of Chenchu Lakshmi for two nights in a row. Whatever the story may be, the weeping in the film still makes me shudder. Atla Padaro is a good song! - The song "Kanipinchitiva, Narasimha" was sung very melodiously. It would be a happy thing to see that Narasimham. But it's heartbreaking to hear that.

References

External links 

 Chenchu Lakshmi film at Ghantasala.info

1943 films
1940s Telugu-language films
Indian black-and-white films
Indian fantasy films
Films scored by C. R. Subbaraman
Films scored by R. N. Chinnayya
Films scored by S. Rajeswara Rao